The millimetre (international spelling; SI unit symbol mm) or millimeter (American spelling) is a unit of length in the International System of Units (SI), equal to one thousandth of a metre, which is the SI base unit of length. Therefore, there are one thousand millimetres in a metre. There are ten millimetres in a centimetre.

One millimetre is equal to  micrometres or  nanometres.
Since an inch is officially defined as exactly 25.4 millimetres, a millimetre is equal to exactly  (≈ 0.03937) of an inch.

Definition

Informal terminology
A common shortening of millimetre in spoken English is "mil".  This can cause confusion since in the United States, "mil" traditionally means a thousandth of an inch.

Unicode symbols
For the purposes of compatibility with Chinese, Japanese and Korean (CJK) characters, Unicode has symbols for:
 millimetre - 
 square millimetre - 
 cubic millimetre 

In Japanese typography, these square symbols are used for laying out unit symbols without distorting the grid layout of text characters.

Measurement
On a metric ruler, the smallest measurements are normally millimetres. High-quality engineering rulers may be graduated in increments of 0.5 mm. Digital callipers are commonly capable of reading increments as small as 0.01 mm.

Microwaves with a frequency of 300 GHz have a wavelength of 1 mm. Using wavelengths between 30 GHz and 300 GHz for data transmission, in contrast to the 300 MHz to 3 GHz normally used in mobile devices, has the potential to allow data transfer rates of 10 gigabits per second.

The smallest distances the human eye can resolve is around 0.02 to 0.04 mm, approximately the width of a thin human hair. A sheet of paper is typically between 0.07 mm and 0.18 mm thick, with ordinary printer paper or copy paper approximately 0.1 mm thick.

See also

 Metric system
 Orders of magnitude (length)
 Submillimetre astronomy

References

Metre
-03
1000 (number)